Ezergailis (feminine: Ezergaile) is a Latvian surname, derived from the Latvian word for "bittern". Individuals with the surname include:

Andrew Ezergailis (born 1930), historian
Inta Ezergailis (1932–2005), historian and author
Karlis Ezergailis (born 1985), speedway rider

Latvian-language masculine surnames